"Amanda" is a power ballad by American rock band Boston written by Tom Scholz. The song was released as the first single from the band's third album, Third Stage, in 1986, six years after it was recorded.

Although the song did not have a promotional music video, "Amanda" became the band's highest charting single in the United States and Canada. In the United States, the single topped the Billboard Hot 100 in November, 1986, for two consecutive weeks (the band's only number 1 on the Hot 100), and topped for three consecutive weeks on the Mainstream Rock chart, in October of the same year, while in the latter the single topped RPM magazine's Top Singles and Adult Contemporary charts.

It was the band's first officially released single since 1978 and their first released by MCA Records. The 12-string guitar parts are played by Scholz.

Background

Guitarist Tom Scholz recorded the demos in 1980, including the guitar solo that would later be featured in "Amanda". Between then and 1981 Scholz had to rework the song to finish it. He stated: 

"Amanda" was not a real woman. Instead, the name was chosen because it flowed well with the lyrics.

Reception 
In early 1984 a raw demo of the song was leaked to radio stations via a syndicated satellite feed. Despite the poor audio quality the first new studio Boston song to be heard in six years became the most requested song at AOR (Album-oriented rock) stations that played the bootleg.
"Amanda" is a relatively rare example of a song that reached #1 on the Billboard Hot 100 in or after the 1980s without having a performance music video made for it.  An interview for British television, made while the band was promoting the Third Stage album, does show a couple of minutes of a music video near the end.  The band does not appear in that video, which intersperses shots of a model smiling for the camera with special effects footage of the band's spaceship logo flying over the Boston skyline.  One shot shows the animated spaceship almost colliding with the John Hancock Tower. Despite being released in that country, the single failed to chart on the UK singles chart.

The song was eventually certified gold by the Canadian Recording Industry Association with sales of over 50,000 units.

Cash Box called it a "romantic ballad that features...Tom Scholz' trademark guitar" and a "pretty and memorable song."   Classic Rock critic Paul Elliott rated "Amanda" as Boston's 5th greatest song.

Charts

Weekly charts

Year-End charts

Certifications

References 

1980 songs
1986 singles
1980s ballads
Boston (band) songs
Billboard Hot 100 number-one singles
Cashbox number-one singles
RPM Top Singles number-one singles
American soft rock songs
Glam metal ballads
Songs written by Tom Scholz
Song recordings produced by Tom Scholz
MCA Records singles